NGC 3305 is an elliptical galaxy located about 190 million light-years away in the constellation Hydra. The galaxy was discovered by astronomer John Herschel on March 24, 1835. NGC 3305 is a member of the Hydra Cluster.

See also 
 List of NGC objects (3001–4000)

References

External links

Hydra Cluster
Hydra (constellation)
Elliptical galaxies
3305 
31421 
Astronomical objects discovered in 1835